William Wells (14 March 1881 – 18 March 1939) was an English cricketer active from 1904 to 1926 who played for Northamptonshire (Northants).

Biography 
He was born in Daventry, Northamptonshire on 14 March 1881 and died there on 18 March 1939, aged 58. Wells appeared in 269 first-class matches as a righthanded batsman who bowled right arm fast medium pace. He scored 6,324 runs with a highest score of 119, one of two centuries, and took 751 wickets with a best performance of eight for 35.

Notes

1881 births
1939 deaths
English cricketers
Northamptonshire cricketers
People from Daventry